Brushy Creek (San Gabriel River) is a river in Texas that flows east for 69 miles.

Route

South Brushy Creek forks off from Brushy Creek and runs south of Cedar Park, Texas. North Fork Brushy Creek and South Fork Brushy Creek branch off from Brushy Creek north of Leander, Texas. The "round rock" of Round Rock, Texas sits in Brushy Creek. Brushy Creek ultimately merges into the San Gabriel River.

Parks
There are long term plans to create a trail that will go from Leander to Hutto, Texas, via Cedar Park and Round Rock, following the route of Brushy Creek. The following segments have currently been created:

 Sarita Valley Greenbelt. Ground broke on the Sarita Valley neighborhood in early 2011. This greenbelt was created as a requirement of Leander's Parkland Dedication Ordinance and is owned and maintained by the City of Leander. The trail itself begins at the convergence of the North and South Forks of Brushy Creek.
 Brushy Creek Regional Trail. Williamson County, Texas maintains roughly 7.75 miles of trail that run along South Brushy Creek, starting at Twin Lakes Park along a 2.75 mile segment that was constructed in 2008, as part of the $1.5 million phase III. Phase I was constructed in 2003 at a budget of $1.5 million and runs for 3 mi, west from Parmer Lane to the intersection of Brushy Creek Road and Great Oaks Drive. Construction on the 0.9 phase V concluded in 2020 at a cost of $3.1 million. Phase V runs from the Creekside Plaza Shopping Center in Round Rock, located at Chisholm Trail and Round Rock Avenue to 30°31'04.3"N 97°42'09.6"W where it dead ends. There is a 1.5 mi gap from this dead end to the rest of the trail (which ceases to follow Brushy Creek at 30°31'31.6"N 97°43'20.6"W and ultimately ends in the Fern Bluff MUD) that will be closed in Phase VI.
 Brushy Creek Trail - City of Round Rock. Round Rock, Texas maintains roughly 3.1 miles of trail from A.W. Grimes Blvd. to Red Bud Ln. Construction on this segment began in 2008 at a cost of $3 million

See also
List of rivers of Texas

External links
 Upper Brushy Creek Water Control & Improvement District
 Lower Brushy Creek Water Control & Improvement District

References

USGS Geographic Names Information Service
USGS Hydrologic Unit Map - State of Texas (1974)

Rivers of Texas